Rafael Nadal was the defending champion, but did not participate this year.

Marcos Baghdatis won the title, beating Mario Ančić 6–4, 6–0 in the final.

Seeds

Draw

Finals

Top half

Bottom half

References

 Main Draw
 Qualifying Draw

2006 ATP Tour
2006 China Open (tennis)